Psammophis longifrons, the  stout sand snake or long sand racer, is a species of snake found in India.

Description
Greyish above in front, browner behind, the scales edged with black, particularly those of vertebral region. The top of the head is uniform greyish brown, or the scales are edged with black. Greyish or yellowish below. Total length 1230 mm, tail 375 mm. Of considerably stouter build than the other Indian member of this genus.

Maxillary teeth 12 or 13, 2 in the middle very strongly enlarged, and preceded and followed by a distinct interval; internasal small, 1/2 or less than 1/2 the length of prefrontals; frontal long and narrow, not longer than its distance from end of snout, the anterior end suddenly not enlarged, not greatly broader there than in the middle, not in contact with the preocular;  temporals 2+2, 8 supralabials 4th and 5th touching eye. V.166–175; C.79–93; A.2.

Distribution
In Maharashtra it is reported from Bombay presidency north of 19 degree (Thana and Damanganga districts, Bulsar, Panch Mahal), C.P(Nagpur) and Amravati. In Gujarat; Surat, Valsad, Navsari. In Madhya Pradesh it is recorded from Ujjain and Hoshangabad. These records show that this species is distributed in a very narrow range, including three western Indian states, namely Gujarat (central and south), Maharashtra (northern) and Madhya Pradesh (mainly southern west).

Food and behaviour
Its habits are both terrestrial and arboreal.

In captivity (for a short period), it was observed that the snakes were timid and well set without any aggression. Five types of lizards (Hemidactylus flaviviridis, H. triedrus, Calotes versicolor, and Eutropis carinata and four types of frogs (Duttaphrynus melanostictus, Euphlyctis cyanophlyctis, Sphaerotheca breviceps, and Polypedates maculatus) were provided and accepted as food.

Reproduction
A female collected in Gujarat laid eight capsule shaped eggs.

References

Vyas and Patel (2013), NOTES ON DISTRIBUTION AND NATURAL HISTORY OF Psammophis longifrons BOULENGER 1896 (SERPENTES: PSAMMOPHIIDAE: PSAMMOPHIINAE) IN GUJARAT, INDIA. Russian Journal of Herpetology. Vol. 20, No. 3, 2013, pp. 217 – 222

Further reading
 

Psammophis
Snakes of Asia
Reptiles of India
Endemic fauna of India
Reptiles described in 1890
Taxa named by George Albert Boulenger